The cephalosporins (sg. ) are a class of β-lactam antibiotics originally derived from the fungus Acremonium, which was previously known as Cephalosporium.

Together with cephamycins, they constitute a subgroup of β-lactam antibiotics called cephems. Cephalosporins were discovered in 1945, and first sold in 1964.

Discovery 
The aerobic mold which yielded cephalosporin C was found in the sea near a sewage outfall in Su Siccu, by Cagliari harbour in Sardinia, by the Italian pharmacologist Giuseppe Brotzu in July 1945.

Structure
Cephalosporin contains a 6-membered dihydrothiazine ring. Substitutions at position 3 generally affect pharmacology; substitutions at position 7 affect antibacterial activity, but these cases are not always true.

Medical uses
Cephalosporins can be indicated for the prophylaxis and treatment of infections caused by bacteria susceptible to this particular form of antibiotic. First-generation cephalosporins are active predominantly against Gram-positive bacteria, such as Staphylococcus and Streptococcus. They are therefore used mostly for skin and soft tissue infections and the prevention of hospital-acquired surgical infections. Successive generations of cephalosporins have increased activity against Gram-negative bacteria, albeit often with reduced activity against Gram-positive organisms.

The antibiotic may be used for patients who are allergic to penicillin due to the different β-lactam antibiotic structure. The drug is able to be excreted in the urine.

Side effects
Common adverse drug reactions (ADRs) (≥ 1% of patients) associated with the cephalosporin therapy include: diarrhea, nausea, rash, electrolyte disturbances, and pain and inflammation at injection site. Infrequent ADRs (0.1–1% of patients) include vomiting, headache, dizziness, oral and vaginal candidiasis, pseudomembranous colitis, superinfection, eosinophilia, nephrotoxicity, neutropenia, thrombocytopenia, and fever.

The commonly quoted figure of 10% of patients with allergic hypersensitivity to penicillins and/or carbapenems also having cross-reactivity with cephalosporins originated from a 1975 study looking at the original cephalosporins, and subsequent "safety first" policy meant this was widely quoted and assumed to apply to all members of the group. Hence, it was commonly stated that they are contraindicated in patients with a history of severe, immediate allergic reactions (urticaria, anaphylaxis, interstitial nephritis, etc.) to penicillins, carbapenems, or cephalosporins. This, however, should be viewed in the light of recent epidemiological work suggesting, for many second-generation (or later) cephalosporins, the cross-reactivity rate with penicillin is much lower, having no significantly increased risk of reactivity over the first generation based on the studies examined. The British National Formulary previously issued blanket warnings of 10% cross-reactivity, but, since the September 2008 edition, suggests, in the absence of suitable alternatives, oral cefixime or cefuroxime and injectable cefotaxime, ceftazidime, and ceftriaxone can be used with caution, but the use of cefaclor, cefadroxil, cefalexin, and cefradine should be avoided.

Overall, the research shows that all beta lactams have the intrinsic hazard of very serious hazardous reactions in susceptible patients. Only the frequency of these reactions vary, based on the structure. Recent papers have shown that a major feature in determining frequency of immunological reactions is the similarity of the side chains (e.g., first generation cephalosporins are similar to penicillins), and this is the reason the β-lactams are associated with different frequencies of serious reactions (e.g., anaphylaxis).

Several cephalosporins are associated with hypoprothrombinemia and a disulfiram-like reaction with ethanol. These include latamoxef (moxalactam), cefmenoxime, cefoperazone, cefamandole, cefmetazole, and cefotetan.  This is thought to be due to the N-methylthiotetrazole side-chain of these cephalosporins, which blocks the enzyme vitamin K epoxide reductase (likely causing hypothrombinemia) and aldehyde dehydrogenase (causing alcohol intolerance). Thus, consumption of alcohol after taking Cephalosporin orally or intravenously is contraindicated, and in severe cases can lead to death.

Mechanism of action
Cephalosporins are bactericidal and, like other β-lactam antibiotics, disrupt the synthesis of the peptidoglycan layer forming the bacterial cell wall.  The peptidoglycan layer is important for cell wall structural integrity.  The final transpeptidation step in the synthesis of the peptidoglycan is facilitated by penicillin-binding proteins (PBPs). PBPs bind to the D-Ala-D-Ala at the end of muropeptides (peptidoglycan precursors) to crosslink the peptidoglycan. Beta-lactam antibiotics mimic the D-Ala-D-Ala site, thereby irreversibly inhibiting PBP crosslinking of peptidoglycan.

Resistance
Resistance to cephalosporin antibiotics can involve either reduced affinity of existing PBP components or the acquisition of a supplementary β-lactam-insensitive PBP. Compared to other β-lactam antibiotics (such as penicillins), they are less susceptible to β-lactamases. Currently, some Citrobacter freundii, Enterobacter cloacae, Neisseria gonorrhoeae, and Escherichia coli strains are resistant to cephalosporins. Some Morganella morganii, Proteus vulgaris, Providencia rettgeri, Pseudomonas aeruginosa, Serratia marcescens and Klebsiella pneumoniae strains have also developed resistance to cephalosporins to varying degrees.

Classification
The cephalosporin nucleus can be modified to gain different properties. Cephalosporins are sometimes grouped into "generations" by their antimicrobial properties.

The first cephalosporins were designated first-generation cephalosporins, whereas, later, more extended-spectrum cephalosporins were classified as second-generation cephalosporins. Each newer generation has significantly greater Gram-negative antimicrobial properties than the preceding generation, in most cases with decreased activity against Gram-positive organisms. Fourth-generation cephalosporins, however, have true broad-spectrum activity.

The classification of cephalosporins into "generations" is commonly practised, although the exact categorization is often imprecise. For example, the fourth generation of cephalosporins is not recognized as such in Japan. In Japan, cefaclor is classed as a first-generation cephalosporin, though in the United States it is a second-generation one; and cefbuperazone, cefminox, and cefotetan are classed as second-generation cephalosporins.

Third generation 

Cefmetazole and cefoxitin are classed as third-generation cephems. Flomoxef and latamoxef are in a new class called oxacephems.

Fourth generation 

Fourth-generation cephalosporins as of March, 2007, were considered to be "a class of highly potent antibiotics that are among medicine's last defenses against several serious human infections" according to The Washington Post.

Further generations 
Some state that cephalosporins can be divided into five or even six generations, although the usefulness of this organization system is of limited clinical relevance.

Naming 

Most first-generation cephalosporins were originally spelled "ceph-" in English-speaking countries. This continues to be the preferred spelling in the United States, Australia, and New Zealand, while European countries (including the United Kingdom) have adopted the International Nonproprietary Names, which are always spelled "cef-". Newer first-generation cephalosporins and all cephalosporins of later generations are spelled "cef-", even in the United States.

Activity 
The mnemonic "LAME" is used to note organisms against which cephalosporins do not have activity:
 Listeria
 Atypicals (including Mycoplasma and Chlamydia)
 MRSA
 Enterococci

Fifth-generation cephalosporins, however, are effective against MRSA.

Overview table

History

Cephalosporin compounds were first isolated from cultures of Acremonium strictum from a sewer in Sardinia in 1948 by Italian scientist Giuseppe Brotzu. He noticed these cultures produced substances that were effective against Salmonella typhi, the cause of typhoid fever, which had β-lactamase. Guy Newton and Edward Abraham at the Sir William Dunn School of Pathology at the University of Oxford isolated cephalosporin C. The cephalosporin nucleus, 7-aminocephalosporanic acid (7-ACA), was derived from cephalosporin C and proved to be analogous to the penicillin nucleus 6-aminopenicillanic acid (6-APA), but it was not sufficiently potent for clinical use. Modification of the 7-ACA side chains resulted in the development of useful antibiotic agents, and the first agent, cefalotin (cephalothin), was launched by Eli Lilly and Company in 1964.

References

External links
 Cephalosporins

Acetaldehyde dehydrogenase inhibitors
 
Medical mnemonics
Enones